Brajnovac (Serbian Cyrillic: Брајновац) is a village in Central Serbia (Šumadija), in the municipality of Rekovac (Region of Levač), located at , at an elevation of . According to the 2002 census, the village had 221 citizens.

External links
 Levac Online
 Article about Brajnovac
 Pictures

Populated places in Pomoravlje District
Šumadija